Anil Kumar Chanda (born 23 May 1906-21 April 1976) was elected to the Lok Sabha, the lower house of the Parliament of India as a member of the Indian National Congress. He was the Deputy Minister of External Affairs and later Deputy Minister, Works, Housing and Supply Ministry in Nehru Ministry. He studied at the London School of Economics and Political Science and worked as chief secretary to Rabindranath Tagore in Shantiniketan. He and his wife author Rani Chanda (1912-1997) were the closest associates of Rabindranath Tagore during the last decade of his life. Rani Chanda gifted few beautiful memoirs of that period to the Bengali readers. They had one son, Abhijit Chanda. They eventually settled in Shantiniketan.

References

External links
 Official biographical sketch in Parliament of India website

Indian National Congress  politicians from West Bengal
India MPs 1952–1957
India MPs 1957–1962
India MPs 1967–1970
Lok Sabha members from West Bengal
1906 births
1976 deaths